Game of Talents is an international television game show franchise of Spanish origin, in which two teams of contestants compete to guess the hidden talent of a series of performers. The original Spanish version debuted on 13 May 2019 on Cuatro.

International versions

References

Game shows
G